E3 ubiquitin-protein ligase Arkadia is an enzyme that in humans is encoded by the RNF111 gene.

Function 

The protein encoded by this gene contains a RING finger domain, a motif known to be involved in protein-protein and protein-DNA interactions. The mouse counterpart of this gene (Rnf111/arkadia) has been shown to genetically interact with the transforming growth factor (TGF) beta-like factor Nodal, and act as a modulator of the nodal signaling cascade, which is essential for the induction of mesoderm during embryonic development.

Interactions 

RNF111 has been shown to interact with Mothers against decapentaplegic homolog 7 and Mothers against decapentaplegic homolog 3.

References

Further reading 

 
 
 
 
 
 
 
 
 

RING finger proteins